Acrobasis obliqua is a moth of the family Pyralidae. It is found in southern Europe.

References 

Moths described in 1847
Acrobasis
Moths of Europe